Levin Irving Handy (December 24, 1861 – February 3, 1922) was an American educator, lawyer and politician, from Wilmington in New Castle County, Delaware. He was a member of the Democratic Party, who served as U. S. Representative from Delaware. He was known by his middle name.

Early life and family
Handy was born in Berlin, Maryland, son of the Rev. William C. Handy, a Presbyterian minister. His grandfathers were William W. Handy, a prominent Somerset County, Maryland lawyer, and the Rev. Robert J. Breckinridge of Kentucky. As the son of a frequently moving minister, he grew up living in multiple places, namely New York, Kentucky and the Eastern Shore of Maryland. He married Mary Bell in 1887 and they had two children, L. Irving Jr., and Margaret. He was also the nephew of William C.P. Breckenridge, a prominent Confederate Army officer and U.S. Representative from Kentucky.

Professional and political career
Handy taught school at Dames Quarter, in Somerset County, Maryland, and in 1881, at the age of 19, was selected to be principal of the high school at Smyrna, Delaware. By 1887 he was superintendent of all the public schools in Kent County, Delaware, and by 1890 he had been hired as principal of Old Newark Academy, in Newark, Delaware. Meanwhile, he was studying the law with John R. Nicholson of Dover, Delaware and frequently speaking at teacher's training schools in the region.

Retiring from teaching in 1892, he became an editorial writer for the Wilmington Every Evening newspaper.  He also studied law, was admitted to the bar in 1899, and began the practice of law in Delaware.

With his retirement from teaching he took a more active role in politics, becoming chairman of the Democratic State Committee from 1892 until 1896. He sought the 1894 Democratic nomination for U.S. Representative, but lost to Samuel Bancroft, who himself lost in the election.

Handy was elected to the U.S. House of Representatives in 1896, defeating incumbent Republican U.S. Representative Jonathan S. Willis. During this term, he served in the Democratic minority in the 55th Congress. Seeking reelection in 1898, he lost to Republican John H. Hoffecker, a Smyrna businessman and relative of his wife. In all he served from March 4, 1897 until March 3, 1899, during the administration of U.S. President William McKinley. Subsequently, Handy remained active in politics, attending the Democratic National Conventions of 1900, 1904, and 1908, and losing an election for state Attorney General in 1904. He ran for U.S. Representative one more time, in 1908, but lost to Republican William H. Heald.

Death and legacy
Handy died at Wilmington and is buried in the Glenwood Cemetery at Smyrna, Delaware. His daughter, Margaret, became a prominent physician in Wilmington. She practiced for fifty-five years, and was a leader in establishing milk banks for premature babies. Andrew Wyeth painted her portrait and named it ‘’Children’s Doctor.’’

Almanac
Elections are held the first Tuesday after November 1st. U.S. Representatives took office March 4th and have a two-year term.

References

External links
Biographical Directory of the United States Congress 
Delaware Members of Congress

Political Graveyard

Places with more information
Delaware Historical Society; website; 505 North Market Street, Wilmington, Delaware 19801; (302) 655-7161
University of Delaware; Library website; 181 South College Avenue, Newark, Delaware 19717; (302) 831-2965
Newark Free Library; 750 Library Ave., Newark, Delaware; (302) 731-7550

1861 births
1922 deaths
Breckinridge family
People from Wilmington, Delaware
People from Berlin, Maryland
Delaware lawyers
Burials in Kent County, Delaware
Democratic Party members of the United States House of Representatives from Delaware
19th-century American lawyers